East of the Sun is a 2001 compilation album by English folk/rock singer-songwriter Roy Harper featuring 15 of his love songs.

History 

Of the songs chose for the album, Harper said;

Of the individuals referred to within (or by) the songs Harper stated,

Track listing
All tracks credited to Roy Harper
"I'll See You Again" – 5:00 (from Valentine) 
"Francesca" – 1:20 (from Flat Baroque and Berserk)
"Another Day" – 2:59 (from Flat Baroque and Berserk)
"North Country" – 3:29 (from Valentine)
"South Africa" – 4:04 (from Lifemask)
"The Flycatcher" – 4:09 (from The Unknown Soldier)
"My Friend" – 3:42 (from Sophisticated Beggar)
"East Of The Sun" – 3:04 (from Flat Baroque and Berserk)
"Commune" – 4:34 (from Valentine)
"Davey" – 1:31 (from Flat Baroque and Berserk)
"Twelve Hours Of Sunset" – 4:45 (from Valentine)
"Hallucinating Light" – 6:05 (from HQ)
"Forever" – 2:48 (from Valentine)
"Sexy Woman" – 6:29 (from The Green Man)
"Frozen Moment" – 3:20 (from Whatever Happened to Jugula?)

Personnel 

Roy Harper – Guitar and vocals
David Bedford
Steve Broughton
Bill Bruford – drums
Dave Cochrane
Dave Lawson – Keyboard
Tony Levin
Jeff Martin
Andy Newmark
Jimmy Page – Guitar
Andy Roberts – Guitar
Chris Spedding – Guitar
Pete Wingfield – Keyboard
Robert Irivie – Photography
Colin Curwood – Photography
Harry Pearce – Design

References

External links 
Roy Harper Official Site
Excellent Roy Harper resource

Roy Harper (singer) compilation albums
2001 compilation albums